Seo Sook-hyang is a South Korean television screenwriter. She made her writing debut after 나의 가장 사랑스러운 적 won at a KBS drama-writing competition and was aired in December 2002 on the single-episode anthology Drama City. Seo became best known for writing low-key romantic comedy-dramas, notably Pasta (2010), which focuses on an arrogant chef at an Italian restaurant and his meek yet determined underling. She continued to collaborate with Pasta TV director Kwon Seok-jang on Romance Town (2011) and Miss Korea (2013).

Filmography
Ask the Stars (tvN, 2023)
Greasy Melo (SBS, 2018)
Don't Dare to Dream (SBS, 2016)
Miss Korea (MBC, 2013-2014)
Romance Town (KBS2, 2011)
Pasta (MBC, 2010)
Lawyers of the Great Republic of Korea aka Love and Law (MBC, 2008)
Mr. Goodbye (KBS2, 2006)
Rebirth: Next (MBC, 2005)
Drama City "쑥과 마늘에 관한 진실" (KBS2, 2003)
Drama City "오줌장군" (KBS2, 2003)
Drama City "나의 가장 사랑스러운 적" (KBS2, 2002)

References

External links

Living people
South Korean screenwriters
South Korean television writers
Year of birth missing (living people)